James Vallely (born August 30, 1954) is an American television producer, and screenwriter.  He was a writer and consulting producer for Arrested Development, a multiple Emmy Award-winning television show on the Fox network, and was an executive producer and co-creator of Running Wilde, also on Fox, along with Mitchell Hurwitz and Will Arnett.

His work on Arrested Development won him a Primetime Emmy Award and a Writers Guild Of America Award.

Vallely grew up in East Brunswick Township, New Jersey, graduating from East Brunswick High School in 1972.  He attended both Middlesex County College and New York University, and later moved to California in 1982.  He wrote for a number of TV series, including ten episodes of The Golden Girls, which was his first paid work as a writer, The John Larroquette Show, and Ladies Man. His daughter is former child actor Tannis Vallely.

References

External links
 

1954 births
Living people
American television writers
East Brunswick High School alumni
American male television writers
Primetime Emmy Award winners
Middlesex County College alumni
New York University alumni
People from East Brunswick, New Jersey
Writers Guild of America Award winners
Screenwriters from New Jersey
Television producers from New Jersey